The Mongolian Radio Sport's Federation (MRSF) (in Mongolian, Монголын Радио Спортын Холбоо) is a national non-profit organization for amateur radio enthusiasts in Mongolia.  Early activities of the organization focused on radiosport, and the MRSF was active in promoting Amateur Radio Direction Finding competitions throughout the country. MRSF supports local competitions in Amateur Radio Direction Finding as well as a national team that travels to regional and world championship events.  Although the MRSF has broadened its scope and now supports many kinds of radio activities, the organization's name continues to reflect this early heritage.  MRSF represents the interests of Mongolian amateur radio operators before Mongolian and international telecommunications regulatory authorities.  MRSF is the national member society representing Mongolia in the International Amateur Radio Union.

See also 
Mongolian Amateur Radio Society

References 

Mongolia
Organizations established in 1967
1967 establishments in Mongolia
Organizations based in Ulaanbaatar
Radio in Mongolia